Amore scusami is an album by Dalida, released in December 1964.

Track listing
Barclay – 80 250,

See also 
 List of Dalida songs

References

Sources

Dalida albums
1964 albums
French-language albums
Barclay (record label) albums